Kemal Haşim Karpat (15 February 1924, Babadag Tulcea, Romania – 20 February 2019, Manchester, New Hampshire, United States) was a Romanian-Turkish naturalised American historian and professor at the University of Wisconsin–Madison.

Early life 
He was of Turkish origin and born in Babadag, Romania. He received his LLB from the University of Istanbul, his MA from the University of Washington and his PhD from New York University. He previously worked for the UN Economics and Social Council and taught at the University of Montana (though it was called Montana State University at the time) and New York University. His final post was at Istanbul Şehir University.

Selected publications
 Elites and Religion: From Ottoman Empire to Turkish Republic  (Times, 2010)
 The Gecekondu: Rural Migration and Urbanization (Cambridge University Press; 2009) 
The Politicization of Islam (Oxford University Press, 2001)
The Ottoman Past and Today's Turkey (Brill, 2000)
Political and Social Thought in the Contemporary Middle East (Praeger, 1968)
Turkey's Politics: The Transition to a Multi-Party System (Princeton University Press, 1959)
Political Modernization in Japan and Turkey (Princeton University Press, 1964)
An Inquiry into the Social Foundations of Nationalism in the Ottoman State (Princeton UP, 1973)
Social Change and Politics in Turkey (Brill Leiden, 1973)
Turkey's Foreign Policy in Transition (Brill Leiden, 1975)

References

External links
 Interview: 

Scholars of Ottoman history
Romanian people of Crimean Tatar descent
People from Babadag
1923 births
2019 deaths
University of Wisconsin–Madison faculty
University of Washington alumni
New York University alumni
Istanbul University Faculty of Law alumni
Academic staff of Istanbul Şehir University
Romanian Sunni Muslims
Romanian emigrants to Turkey
Turkish emigrants to the United States
Honorary members of the Turkish Academy of Sciences
American Sunni Muslims
20th-century Turkish historians
21st-century Turkish historians
Romanian historians
20th-century American historians
21st-century American historians